Antar may refer to:

Arts and entertainment
Antar (film), 2013 Indian film
Antar (Rimsky-Korsakov), an 1868 symphonic suite by Nikolai Rimsky-Korsakov
Antar, a 1912–1914 opera by Gabriel Dupont
Antar, a 1948 opera by Aziz El-Shawan
 A planet in the Star Wars franchise; see List of Star Wars species (F–J)
 The home planet of the aliens in the television show Roswell
Antar the Black Knight, a five-episode comic series written by Nnedi Okorafor

People

Antar (given name)
Antar (surname)

Other uses
Antar (company), a former French petroleum company
Australians for Native Title and Reconciliation (ANTaR)
Thornycroft Antar ("Mighty Antar"), a post-war British military vehicle

See also

Antal (given name)
Antal (surname)
Antão, name
Antara (disambiguation)
Antares (disambiguation)